Guillem Balagué (born 2 November 1968) is a Spanish football journalist, author, and pundit. He was a regular pundit on Sky Sports' show Revista de la Liga and has also written for some of Britain's newspapers as well as several Spanish newspapers.

Journalism 
In June 2008, Balagué launched his own personal website featuring a blog, news and the opportunity to interact with him directly.

Balagué is a journalist and has written for several English and Spanish newspapers. He is currently preparing a football documentary and also the first Pep Guardiola biography in English. He has written articles in British newspapers The Times and The Observer, as well as a weekly column in the free daily commuter newspaper The Metro commenting mainly on stories involving continental football. He also occasionally writes for sport website Bleacher Report.

He is also well known for his work with Spanish football newspaper Diario AS and Spain's national radio station CADENA SER, where he features on phone-ins regularly

Balagué and Gabriele Marcotti presented The Game podcast, hosted by The Times, for the 2007–08 Premier League season.

Balagué appeared as a contestant on an episode of Pointless Celebrities teamed with former Argentina international footballer Ossie Ardiles, first broadcast on 29 April 2017.

His book, Cristiano Ronaldo. The Biography was named Football Book of the Year 2016 in Polish Sports Book Awards (Sportowa Książka Roku).

Since Sky Sports lost their rights to La Liga he has appeared many Thursdays on BBC Radio 5 Live's Football Daily, Euro Leagues podcast.

Involvement in football 
In 2013, he became a B licensed coach, and in 2014 he became Director of Football at English non-league football team Biggleswade United, and is now the chairman of the club.

Books

References

External links 

1968 births
Living people
Writers from Barcelona
Spanish journalists
Spanish non-fiction writers
Spanish expatriates in England
20th-century births